The Doctor of Nursing Practice (DNP) is a professional degree in nursing. In the United States, the DNP is one of three doctorate degrees in nursing, the others being the research degrees PhD and the Doctor of Nursing Science. Internationally, since the 1990s, there have been a wide number of doctorate degrees available for nurses, including DProf, PhD and others. Internationally all such doctoral nursing degrees include mandatory research elements and take longer than a single year to complete.

DNP in North America
The curriculum for the United States DNP degree builds on traditional master's programs by providing education in evidence-based practice, quality improvement, and systems leadership, and is typically more clinically-oriented than PhD or DNS degrees. Advanced practice registered nurses (APRNs) include the nurse practitioner (NP), certified registered nurse anesthetist (CRNA), Certified Nurse‐Midwife (CNM), and the clinical nurse specialist (CNS) and are prepared in master's-degree programs. Although approximately 52% of nurse anesthetist programs will award the DNP, the remaining 48% may use the title doctor of nurse anesthesia practice (DNAP).

Education requirements in the United States 
According to the American Association of Colleges of Nursing (AACN), transitioning advance practice registered nursing programs from the graduate level to the doctoral level is a "...response to changes in health care delivery and emerging health care needs, additional knowledge or content areas have been identified by practicing nurses. In addition, the knowledge required to provide leadership in the discipline of nursing is so complex and rapidly changing that additional or doctoral level education is needed." According to the AACN, "...benefits of practice-focused doctoral programs include:
 development of needed advanced competencies for increasingly complex clinical, faculty and leadership roles;
 enhanced knowledge to improve nursing practice and patient outcomes;
 enhanced leadership skills to strengthen practice and health care delivery;
 better match of program requirements and credits and time with the credential earned;
 provision of an advanced educational credential for those who require advanced practice knowledge but do not need or want a strong research focus (e.g. clinical faculty);
 enhanced ability to attract individuals to nursing from non-nursing backgrounds;
 increased supply of faculty for clinical instruction; and
 improved image of nursing."

Transitioning toward the doctorate 
In the United States, the American Association of Colleges of Nursing (AACN) recommended that all entry-level nurse practitioner educational programs be transitioned from the Master of Science in Nursing (MSN) degree to the DNP degree. The American Association of Nurse Anesthetists has followed suit, requiring the DNP (or DNAP-doctor of nurse anesthesia practice) degree for entry-level nurse anesthetist programs by the year 2025. Meanwhile, the National Association of Clinical Nurse Specialists (NACNS) announced in July 2015 its endorsement of the doctor of nursing practice (DNP) as the required degree for CNS entry into practice by 2030. Nurse practitioners and nurse anesthetists currently practicing with either an MSN or certificate will not be required to obtain the DNP for continued practice.

In the United States there are two terminal doctorate degrees in the field of nursing: The doctor of nursing practice (DNP), and the doctor of philosophy (PhD). Previous doctorate level degrees have been, or are in the process of being phased out and converted to one of the two terminal degrees.  The doctor of nursing (ND, not to be confused with naturopathic doctor) and the (DrNP) have transitioned into the DNP whereas the doctor of nursing science (DNSc, DNS or DSN) has transitioned into the PhD. The PhD in nursing is generally considered the academic and research-oriented degree, whereas the DNP is the practice-oriented or professional terminal degree.

Controversy 

Afaf I. Meleis and Kathleen Dracup have described the development of DNP courses as "a major mistake for [the] profession of nursing as well as the discipline of nursing knowledge". The required clinical practice hours to be accepted on a DNP course can be as little as zero hours. In other cases where clinical hours are required to gain the DNP, these can include clinical hours undertaken as part of a prior degree.  

This places the DNP at odds with clinical doctorate degrees which require significant amounts of clinical practice hours. A doctorate of clinical psychology for example encompasses 1.5 years of clinical practice time while a medical doctorate includes around 75 weeks of clinical practice (with further instructions clinical hours required to gain specialty medical licenses). In other words, the DNP degree is increasingly ridiculed in the medical community due to the fact that the schools awarding the degree are often essentially degree mills, accepting nurses with little or no bedside experience, following curricula that address no clinically meaningful material, imparting knowledge in little more than nursing theory purportedly to justify their own existence, brief time required to complete the coursework, and ultimately awarding the title of “doctor,” confusing patients, while dangerously attempting to expand scope of practice of nurses, and treading on the turf of much more rigorously trained doctors of medicine (M.D.) and osteopathic medicine (D.O.).

See also

 Advanced practice nurses
 Nurse practitioner
 Nurse midwife
 Clinical nurse specialist
 Nurse anesthetist
 Diploma in Nursing
 Associate of Science in Nursing
 Bachelor of Science in Nursing
 Master of Science in Nursing
 Nurse education
 Nursing school

References 

Nursing Practice
Nursing degrees
Nursing Practice